Marcelo Machado Vilela (born 29 March 1999) is a Brazilian professional footballer who plays as a midfielder for the Portuguese club Oliveira do Hospital on loan from Vizela in the Primeira Liga.

Professional career
A youth product of RB Brasil and Vizela, Vilela began his senior career on successive loans with Vitória Guimarães and Pedras Salgadas before returning to Vilela. He made his professional debut with Vizela in a 4–1 LigaPro loss to Porto B on 19 September 2019.

On 22 September 2021, he joined Oliveira do Hospital on loan.

References

External links
 
 

1999 births
Living people
Sportspeople from Minas Gerais
Brazilian footballers
F.C. Vizela players
F.C. Oliveira do Hospital players
Liga Portugal 2 players
Campeonato de Portugal (league) players
Association football midfielders
Brazilian expatriate footballers
Brazilian expatriate sportspeople in Portugal
Expatriate footballers in Portugal